Chandra Fernando was a priest from the town of Baticaloa in minority Tamil-dominated eastern province of Sri Lanka. He was known for his human rights activism. He was assassinated by unknown men on June 6, 1988.

Biography
Chandra Fernando was born in 1942 in Fernandos Lane, Puliyantheevu (presently called Batticaloa Town), primarily educated at St. Michael's College National School and ordained as Catholic Priest in the year 1970. He served as a Parish Priest at St. Mary’s Co-cathedral, Batticaloa from 1984 to June 6, 1988.

Incident
He was killed by unknown gunmen on June 6, 1988 in his own church (St. Mary’s Co-Cathedral) when the city was under the administration of Indian Peace Keeping Force per the Indo-Lanka peace accord of 1985. He was the secretary of the local Batticalao Citizens Committee and was instrumental in highlighting human rights violations by all sides in the Sri Lankan civil war including the rebel LTTE group which was at that time battling the Indian Peace Keeping Force (IPKF) and  aligned para-military groups. There were many human rights violations committed by all including the authority in power.
Although according to a report by pro LTTE Tamilnet, he was killed by a gunman belonging to the paramilitary group Peoples Liberation Organization of Tamil Eelam (PLOTE) organization working for the local Indian Army administration. but according to David Jeyaraj an ethnic Sri Lankan Tamil journalist based in Canada, he was killed by the paramilitary group Eelam Peoples Revolutionary Liberation Front (EPRLF) operatives. This seems to be corroborated by independent sources.

See also
Other notable clergy killed during the Sri Lankan civil war
George Jeyarajasingham
Nihal Jim Brown
Mary Bastian
Eugene Herbert
Mariampillai Sarathjeevan

References

External links
 SITUATION UPDATE FROM SRI LANKA

Sri Lankan Tamil priests
Minority rights activists
Assassinated Sri Lankan activists
20th-century Sri Lankan Roman Catholic priests
1942 births
1988 deaths
Deaths by firearm in Sri Lanka
People murdered in Sri Lanka
20th-century Roman Catholic martyrs
Alumni of St. Michael's College National School
Indian Peace Keeping Force